Susan Bee (born January 14, 1952) is an American painter, editor, and book artist, who lives in New York City. In 2015, "Photograms and Altered Photos from the 1970s" were exhibited at Southfirst Gallery in Brooklyn. She  had one solo show at Accola Griefen Gallery (2013) and nine solo shows at A.I.R. Gallery in New York.  She has a B.A. from Barnard College and a M.A. in Art from Hunter College. She has taught at the School of Visual Arts MFA in Art Criticism and Writing program. Bee has taught at the University of Pennsylvania and at Pratt Institute. In 2014, Susan Bee was awarded a Guggenheim fellowship.

Artwork
Susan Bee is currently represented by A.I.R. Gallery, where she has been a member since 1996. In addition to those galleries and Accola Griefen, she has had solo shows at the New York Public Library, Kenyon College, Columbia University, William Paterson College, and Virginia Lust Gallery, and her work has been included in numerous group shows. Her work has been described as a "distinctive stylistic blend of folk art and pastoral psychedelia."

Bee has published six artist's books with Granary Books. These include several collaborations with poets: Bed Hangings, with Susan Howe, A Girl’s Life, with Johanna Drucker, The Burning Babe and Other Poems with Jerome Rothenberg, and Log Rhythms and Little Orphan Anagram with Charles Bernstein. In addition, she has published eight artist's books for other publishers, including Fabulas Feminae with Johanna Drucker (2015), Entre (2009) with poems by Regis Bonvicino, from Global Books, Paris, and The Invention Tree (2012) with poems by Jerome McGann, Chax Press.

Her artwork is included in many public and private collections including the Metropolitan Museum of Art, Getty Museum, Victoria & Albert Museum, Yale University, Clark Art Institute, New York Public Library, and Harvard University Library.

Her work has been reviewed in Art in America,  The New York Times, The New Yorker, Art Papers, The Forward, The Brooklyn Rail, and ArtNews. She has had Fellowships at the Virginia Center for the Creative Arts in 2002 and 1999, Yaddo Fellowships in 2001 and 1996, and at the MacDowell Colony in 2012. In addition, she has had publication grants from the Visual Arts Program, the National Endowment for the Arts,  from 1992 to 1997 and Publication Grants, from the Visual Arts Program, New York State Council on the Arts, from 1989 to 1997.

Editing
Bee is the co-editor, with Mira Schor, of M/E/A/N/I/N/G: An Anthology of Artist's Writings, Theory, and Criticism, with writings by over 100 artists, critics, and poets, published by Duke University Press in 2000. She was the co-editor of M/E/A/N/I/N/G: A Journal of Contemporary Art Issues from 1986–1996 and is currently the co-editor of M/E/A/N/I/N/G Online.

Personal life
Susan Bee is married to poet Charles Bernstein. They have two children, Emma Bee Bernstein (May 16, 1985 - December 20, 2008) and Felix Bernstein (born May 20, 1992). Her parents, Miriam Laufer and Sigmund Laufer, were also artists.

References

External links
Susan Bee at the Electronic Poetry Center
Susan Bee at A.I.R.
Personal Statement on the Brooklyn Museum's website
Conversation/podcast with Susan Bee about her background and trajectory (2020)

1952 births
American women painters
American contemporary painters
Feminist artists
Jewish American artists
Jewish feminists
Living people
Painters from New York (state)
Women book artists
Book artists
21st-century American women artists
21st-century American Jews